Sexual exploitation is frequently experienced by refugees who have fled to Uganda from neighbouring countries.

Overview
Uganda has over 234,000 refugees and 65 percent are from Democratic Republic of Congo and South Sudan.
The other refugees in Uganda come from Ethiopia, Somalia, Eritrea, Burundi, and Rwanda.

Overall situation
Some of the refugees in Ugandan camps are sexually harassed and beaten. These include mostly women, girls and few boys who are between the ages of 14 and 25. These harassments happen across the different refugee settlements in Uganda. A survey conducted by Pan African Development Education and Advocacy Programme (PADEAP) in 2012 under the country director Michael Mafabi revealed that 70% of the women experienced one form of violence, more so with about 45% of them being sexually abused.
According to Mafabi, the victims rarely report these incidents because the culprits have power over them.
These culprits are the people who provide relief to these refugees. Also, Mafabi indicates that when some of these victims go to report, they are harassed in exchange for services.

Causes
Debanjana Choudhuri who visited one of the camps in Uganda has reported that according to the data she obtained, girls frequently experience coerced sexual initiation, which they view as a normal form of relationship. Another source mentioned that culture and religion influence refugees to be victims of abuse and the fact that they fear to be embarrassed if they say anything against what they are experiencing.

Culprits
The culprits are a secretive network of pimps operating in Uganda. The group mostly spread information about their business through word of mouth. They have been advertising refugee women and girls to buyers, some of whom are high-ranking government officials.

Victims
One of the victims of sexual harassment is a girl who fled from South Sudan camp after being raped, only to be raped again in Ugandan camps.
She explained that she lives alone and she gets scared when men come to her area at night. According to the source, there is nothing much she could have done to prevent herself from being raped because she lives in a tent that does not have a door. Other girls who had similar experiences stated that they also live in fear of being attacked by men.

Refugee camps in Uganda
Achol-Pii Refugee Settlement
Bidi Bidi Refugee Settlement
IMVEPI Refugee settlement
Kiryandongo Refugee Settlement
Kyaka II Refugee Settlement
Kyangwali Refugee Settlement
Nakivale Refugee Settlement
Palabek Refugee Settlement
Pagirinya Refugee Settlement
Rhino Camp Refugee Settlement
Rwamwanja Refugee Settlement

Combating
United Nations officials have urged Uganda to investigate allegations of human trafficking and corruption in the refugee camps. The UN resident in Uganda, Rosa Malango, claimed that she had written to the government about allegations including corruption, fraud, trafficking of women and girls, intimidation and harassment of UN personnel. She also claimed that the Ugandan government authorities had made promises to investigate cases, and made it clear that she saw it as her own duty to press for prompt action on any indications of sexual abuse or exploitation. She added that the UN refugee agency and the World Food Programme were carrying out internal audits of their Uganda operations in order to monitor the allegations of corruption.

See also
Sexual slavery

References

External links
Sex Trafficking Cartel Targets Vulnerable Refugees
UN Refugee Agency to Investigate Employees Over Sex Trafficking Allegations

Gallery

Refugees in Uganda
Sexual exploitation